Vice Admiral Sir Thomas Hope Troubridge,  (1 February 1895 – 29 September 1949) was a Royal Navy officer who served as Fifth Sea Lord from 1945 to 1946.

Military career
The son of Admiral Sir Ernest Troubridge and Edith Mary ( Duffus), Troubridge was born in Southsea, Hampshire, on 1 February 1895. He joined the Royal Navy in 1908, and served in the First World War. In 1936 he became naval attaché in Berlin. He also served in the Second World War, initially as commanding officer of the aircraft carrier  carrying much needed sugar back to Britain in July 1940 and then making a number of air strikes on shipping in Norwegian waters and on the seaplane base at Tromsø through October 1940.

Troubridge was given command of the battleship  in June 1941 and then the aircraft carrier  in January 1942. In 1943, he was appointed Rear Admiral Combined Operations and flag officer commanding overseas assault forces, and in June 1944 he led the invasion and capture of Elba.

After the war Troubridge was appointed Fifth Sea Lord and then, from 1946, Flag Officer, Air (Home). His last appointment was as Flag Officer, Air and Second-in-Command, Mediterranean Fleet in 1948.

Family
Troubridge married Lily Emily Kleinwort in August 1925. They had four children: Their eldest son, Peter, became 6th Troubridge baronet on death of his cousin in 1963. Their fourth child, Thomas, married Marie Christine von Reibnitz (later Princess Michael of Kent) in 1971: the marriage was annulled in 1978.

References

1895 births
1949 deaths
Admiralty personnel of World War II
Companions of the Distinguished Service Order
Foreign recipients of the Distinguished Service Medal (United States)
Knights Commander of the Order of the Bath
Recipients of the Legion of Honour
Recipients of the Croix de Guerre 1939–1945 (France)
Royal Navy admirals of World War II
Royal Navy personnel of World War I
Recipients of the Navy Distinguished Service Medal
Military personnel from Portsmouth
Lords of the Admiralty
People from Southsea